GoIF Fram is a sports club in Jönköping, Sweden, established in 1921. It played in the Swedish men's handball top division during the 1939-1940 season, but later became more focused on bowling, establishing a section on 1 April 1960.

References

External links
 Official website 

1921 establishments in Sweden
Swedish handball clubs
Sport in Jönköping
Sports clubs established in 1921